Doloploca punctulana is a moth belonging to the family Tortricidae first described by Michael Denis and Ignaz Schiffermüller in 1775.

It is native to Europe.

References

Tortricinae